Chowdavaram is a neighbourhood of Guntur in the Indian state of Andhra Pradesh. It was merged in Guntur Municipal Corporation in 2012 and is a part of Guntur West mandal (formerly Guntur mandal).

References 

Neighbourhoods in Guntur